Shule may refer to:

Shule Kingdom in Kashgar, an ancient kingdom in Xinjiang, China
Shule County, a county in Xinjiang, China
Shule, a minor figure in the Book of Mormon
Synagogue (Shul or Shule), a Jewish house of worship